Shane Mauss is an American comedian from Onalaska, Wisconsin. Between 2010 and 2015, he released three comedy albums, one of which has been released as a television special; he also stars in the documentary film Psychonautics: A Comic's Exploration Of Psychedelics (2018). He hosts the Here We Are podcast (2014–present), in which he interviews scientists and academics from across the country, and  Mind Under Matter, a comedy/science podcast.

History
Mauss is of German and Irish descent. He has said that his distant ancestors were Jewish and went by the name "Mosche" (Hebrew word for ‘Moses’) in 17th century Switzerland.

According to Mauss, he has wanted to be a standup comedian since he was ten years old. At age 15, he started writing jokes but due to anxiety and being unsure as to how to get into standup comedy, he did not pursue a career until the age of 23. Mauss intended on going to New York City or Los Angeles to start his career but instead decided to move to Boston with a friend. For several months, Mauss performed at open mic nights in Boston while struggling with anxiety. By practicing and with the help of friends, Mauss overcame his anxiety and began performing in comedy clubs approximately six months after starting his career as a standup comedian. Shortly after he started playing in clubs, Mauss entered into the Greater Boston Alternative Comedy Festival and made it to the final round of elimination. He partially credits the attention he received from this achievement for launching his career and has performed at the festival several times since.

In 2007, shortly after his first performance at the Greater Boston Alternative Comedy Festival, Mauss won the Best Standup Comic Award at HBO's Comedy Arts Festival.  This led to Mauss being invited to perform several times on Late Night with Conan O'Brien. He has since performed on Conan O'Brien's various late night talk shows a total of five times.

In 2010, Mauss published his first comedy album, Jokes To Make My Parents Proud. Punchline Magazine named the album one of the top ten albums of 2010.

In 2014, Mauss broke both of his feet while hiking. He used the experience as inspiration for his 2015 comedy album, My Big Break. On June 18 of that year, Mauss appeared on Ken Reid's TV Guidance Counselor podcast. Also that year, his second special, Mating Season (2014), was released.

Mauss's podcast, Here We Are (2014–present), focuses on subjects such as science, psychedelics, and the social trait of "openness", which he describes as not being "scared of novelty and ambiguity, but you really thrive off of it." He has also toured a show called "Stand Up Science". Additionally, Mauss  a comedy/science podcast called Mind Under Matter (2021–present) with artist and fellow podcaster Ramin Nazer, who commonly does voice impressions (including those of other podcast personalities) and creates art for every episode; Patreon-exclusive content includes discussion of these illustrations in the side podcast Mind Under Art. Mauss has also appeared on the podcasts WTF with Marc Maron, The Joe Rogan Experience, You Made It Weird with Pete Holmes, The Duncan Trussell Family Hour, This Past Weekend, and Bertcast.

Filmography

Film

Television

Discography
Jokes To Make My Parents Proud (2010)
Mating Season (2014)
My Big Break (2015)

References

External links

American stand-up comedians
Living people
1980 births
21st-century American comedians
People from Onalaska, Wisconsin